Reba Sabrina Hinojos (born September 16, 1984), known professionally as Sabrina Bryan, is an American dancer, choreographer, actress and singer. She was best known as a member of the girl group The Cheetah Girls, and starred in the Disney Channel Original Movie of the same name and its sequels, The Cheetah Girls 2 and The Cheetah Girls: One World. Before she appeared on television, Bryan was a dancer, and trained at Hart Academy of Dance, located in La Habra, California.

The Cheetah Girls
In 2003, Bryan starred as Dorinda "Do" Thomas in the Disney Channel Original Movie The Cheetah Girls, a musical comedy based on the bestselling series of young adult books of the same name by Deborah Gregory. The film depicts four best friends (Raven-Symoné, Adrienne Bailon, Kiely Williams, and Bryan) who form a pop group in their first year of high school for a talent show and reach unexpected success. Prior to The Cheetah Girls, two of Bryan's castmates Bailon and Williams were members of R&B girl group 3LW. The Cheetah Girls premiered on August 15, 2003, to 6.5 million viewers, a huge ratings success.

Due to the popularity of the film, Bryan and her other bandmates achieved mainstream pop music success as members of the official Cheetah Girls group. The movie's soundtrack reached No. 33 on the Billboard 200 and was certified double-platinum, selling more than 2 million copies in the United States alone. It is one of the best selling albums from Walt Disney Records, alongside the soundtrack to High School Musical. In November 2005, the group released their Christmas album Cheetah-licious Christmas and toured the US on their Cheetah-licious Christmas Tour.

The Cheetah Girls 2 premiered on the Disney Channel on August 25, 2006. Its premiere received the highest ratings of all Disney Channel Movies at its time, bringing in a total of over 8.1 million viewers, beating both the premiere ratings of High School Musical (7.7 million) and the previous highest rated DCOM record holder, Cadet Kelly (7.8 million). The film would also become the highest rated Cheetah Girls movie in the trilogy. The sequel's plot followed the Cheetah Girls as they become largely successful and take a tour of Spain. The film's soundtrack was released on August 15, 2006. It debuted at No. 5 on the Billboard 200, and has moved over 1.4 million copies to date, achieving platinum status.

After the release of Cheetah Girls 2, Bryan, along with her fellow Cheetah Girls, toured the United States on their The Party's Just Begun Tour from September 2006 to March 2007. While touring, The Cheetah Girls began work on their official debut studio album. Bryan was interviewed by Billboard magazine, where she stated that the group was eager to showcase a "more mature" sound to gather an audience of older fans, while still keeping the lyrics clean for the younger fanbase as well. Williams was quoted as saying that the band members co-produced and co-wrote a "good portion" of the album. On September 25, 2007, TCG was released by Hollywood Records, with a debut of No. 44 on the Billboard 200 albums chart. It was the first album by the group not to be released by Walt Disney Records. 126,000 copies have been sold to date.

The third and final part of the franchise, The Cheetah Girls: One World, premiered on August 22, 2008, the only release to not feature Raven Symoné. The film revolves around the three remaining Cheetah Girls visiting India to appear in a Bollywood musical. The movie premiered to over 6.2 million viewers, and reached 7 million viewers in its final half-hour. One Worlds soundtrack was released three days prior to the film's release, on August 19, 2008. It peaked at No. 13 on the Billboard 200. The Cheetah Girls kicked off their One World Tour on October 8, 2008 in Corpus Christi, Texas, and concluded on December 21, 2008 in San Diego, California.

In early 2009, The Cheetah Girls officially announced that they had disbanded, in favor of pursuing solo projects.

Bryan and former Cheetah Girl bandmate and close friend Kiely Williams continued their creative collaboration with the development of a web series talk show, Dinner with Friends. The first episode premiered on July 1, 2011 on YouTube. The series ran for nine episodes, concluding on August 28, 2011.

Television and film appearances
Bryan has acted in several TV shows, with notable guest appearances in several episodes of the soap opera The Bold and the Beautiful. She also appeared in two series pilots, King's Pawn and Driving Me Crazy, neither of which made it to air. She then had guest appearances in shows like The Geena Davis Show and The Jersey. She also appeared in the TV series, Grounded For Life, before her rise to stardom in The Cheetah Girls. She had a small supporting role as Mrs. Murray in the 2008 straight-to-DVD film Mostly Ghostly, and stars in the comedy film Help Me, Help You (formerly titled If It Ain't Broke, Break It). Sabrina is the voice of Pamela Hamster in the animated Disney channel series Fish Hooks appearing in two episodes "Hooray for Hamsterwood" and "Pamela Hamster Returns".
Since, Kiely Williams and Sabrina Bryan will both co-star on the web series "Dinner With Friends", "March Moms", and "Bad Sex With Good People".

Dancing with the Stars
Sabrina competed in the 5th season of Dancing with the Stars. Sabrina and her professional dancing partner, Mark Ballas, received a score of 26 out of 30, at the time the highest score earned in the first week by any contestant. On week 4 of the show, they set another record by receiving a 30/30 from the judges for their paso doble, making her the first contestant to have received a perfect score that early in the show's history. Bryan led all contenders in judges' scoring in weeks 1, 3, and 4.

Bryan received her lowest score, a 25 for a foxtrot, during week 6, in which she also performed a rock 'n' roll routine with the other contestants. That week, she was voted off. The announcement was met by shock and tears from the show's judges, contestants and live audience, since she and Ballas were favored by many to win the competition. An AOL poll voted their elimination "2007's most shocking TV moment". The next week, the remaining dancers and celebrities showed their continued support and affection for Bryan by donning her signature cheetah paw-print tattoo. For the penultimate week, Bryan and Ballas were invited back to the show to perform, another first for any couple as previously non-competition dances had only been performed by pro dancers. For the 100th show, their Paso Doble was chosen as number 9 on the top 10 dances of the first five seasons. Bryan and Ballas were the only couple in the top 10 that did not make it to the finals.

In 2012, Bryan was chosen by the public to compete on the 15th season of the show as one of the All-Stars contestants. She was partnered with Louis Van Amstel. She was eliminated sixth from the show, despite receiving a perfect 30 for her Rumba and topping the leaderboard for two consecutive weeks. Coincidentally, she was eliminated on October 30, 2012, five years to the day she was voted off the first time and in the sixth week.

 Dancing with the Stars performances 
Season 5 with Mark Ballas:

Season 15 with Louis Van Amstel:

In week 4, Paula Abdul was a guest judge.

She was featured in the Soft Scrub Dancing with the Stars Live Tour. She danced with Derek Hough (while Mark was injured), then with Mark, until her last show on January 13, 2008, when she departed for India to film The Cheetah Girls: One World.

She was one of the featured celebrity dancers in the Live Dancing with the Stars Las Vegas show, running April 14 through August 5, 2012 at the Tropicana Resort and Casino theater.

She has been a celebrity correspondent for the behind-the-scenes look at season 8 of Dancing with the Stars for E! News, and TV Guide show Reality Chat. For season 9 of Dancing with the Stars, she co-hosted TV Guide show Reality Chat and hosted backstage at Dancing with the Stars  on abc.com. Bryan was asked back to co-host backstage at Dancing with the Stars for the 10th through 12th seasons. She has interviewed season 10 winner of the series Nicole Scherzinger, country singer Reba McEntire, Evan Lysacek, Erin Andrews, Kate Gosselin, and many more.

Philanthropy
Healthy Kids Challenge
In 2008, it was announced that Bryan would be partnering with Mission Foods as the spokesperson for the Healthy Kids Challenge. One of Bryan's many roles is to provide information to help educate kids on easy ways to stay healthy through nutrition and keeping active.

Solo projects
Byou
Bryan released a DVD workout entitled Byou in December 2005. The workout is especially geared towards young girls with a tagline that reads "Be Happy, Be Healthy – BYOU!". More than a quarter million DVDs have been sold. A soundtrack to the DVD was also released which included the song "Byou", performed by Bryan, as well as other songs by her and other artists. The song "Byou" was also featured on the Radio Disney: Move It! CD which was released in 2006. Bryan released Byou 2, on January 13, 2009. Byou 2 features one exclusive track by Bryan called "C'mon".

Princess of Gossip
Bryan teamed up with popular author Julia DeVillers to write the book Princess of Gossip, the story of an ordinary girl with an extraordinary secret. Princess of Gossip was released on October 8, 2008. It is currently being considered for a possible movie.

Personal life
In April 2017, Bryan became engaged to strategic accounts manager Jordan Lundberg after six years of dating. They were married on October 6, 2018. In March 2020, they announced that they were expecting their first child, a girl due in September. On August 31, 2020, she gave birth to a daughter. In November 2022, they announced that they were expecting their second child.

Filmography

Discography

Albums with the Cheetah GirlsThe Cheetah Girls SoundtrackReleased: August 12, 2003 (U.S.)
Record Company: Walt Disney RecordsCheetah-licious ChristmasReleased: October 11, 2005 (U.S.) 
Record Company: Walt Disney RecordsThe Cheetah Girls 2 SoundtrackReleased: August 25, 2006 (U.S.)
Peak Position: #5
Record Company: Walt Disney RecordsIn Concert: The Party's Just Begun TourReleased: September 10, 2007 (U.S.)
Record Company: Walt Disney RecordsTCGReleased: September 25, 2007 (U.S.)
Peak Position: #44 (U.S.)
Record Company: Hollywood RecordsThe Cheetah Girls: One World SoundtrackReleased: August 19, 2008 (U.S.)
Peak Position: #13
Record Company: Walt Disney Records

Solo albumByouReleased: January 17, 2006 (U.S.)
Record Company: Sony/BMG Special MarketingByou 2'''Released: 2009 (U.S.)
Record Company: Sony/BMG Special Marketing

Songs
"Byou"
"Just Watch Me"
"C'mon" (Alternate version featured in Byou 2)
"Just Getting Started"
"Crazy on the Dance Floor" (from The Cheetah Girls: One World'' soundtrack)

Music Video
2006: "Byou"
2010: "Byou 2"

Tours
The Cheetah Girls – One World Tour (2008)
Dancing with the Stars — The Tour (2007–2008)
The Party's Just Begun Tour (2006–2007)
Cheetah-licious Christmas Tour (2005)

References

External links

 Sabrina Bryan on Myspace.com
 

20th-century American actresses
21st-century American actresses
American musicians of Mexican descent
American child singers
Singer-songwriters from California
American soap opera actresses
American child actresses
American women singer-songwriters
American television actresses
The Cheetah Girls members
Living people
Actresses from California
American actresses of Mexican descent
American choreographers
American female dancers
American dancers
American women writers
American fashion designers
American women fashion designers
American film actresses
American television personalities of Mexican descent
American women pop singers
Hispanic and Latino American musicians
People from Yorba Linda, California
21st-century American women singers
21st-century American singers
Walt Disney Records artists
1984 births